Blazsetin István (Croatian: Stjepan Blažetin) (Nagykanizsa, Hungary,  January 7, 1963) is a Croatian poet, literature critic, literature historian and literature theorist, translator and anthologist from Hungary. He translates literary works from Hungarian to Croatian.

Biography 

Stjepan Blažetin is the son of the Croatian poet from Hungary, Stipan Blažetin. Since government policy at the time of Stjepan's birth allowed only Hungarian names and prohibited Croatian names, both of them have the first name "István" in official documents.

Currently Stjepan Blažetin works in the Department of Croatian Studies in the Faculty of Philosophy (Faculty of Humanities, part of University of Pécs) in Pécs. Blažetin performs the duty of scientific secretary of Scientific Institute of Croats of Hungary.

He has participated in the international scientific meeting Riječki filološki dani  with the topics Hungarian anthologies of Croatian poetry from WWII until today and Ranko Marinković's Kiklop in Hungarian.

He's a contributor to the Croatian minority self-government annual magazine from Budapest Hrvatski kalendar.

He began writing poetry in 1991. HIs first published work also included poems written by the Hungarian Serb Dragomir Dujmov.

According to literature critics, with the works of Stjepan Blažetin the poetry in Croatian of Hungarian Croats has  entered the postmodern era. Blažetin's poetry is influenced by the poetry of Joja Ricov.

Works 

 Generacijska antologija, poetry, 1991 (joint edition of two poets, Hungarian Croat poet Stjepan Blažetin and Hungarian Serb poet Dragomir Dujmov; Blažetin's part of the book is titled Krhotine; Dujmov's part is titled Pesme/Pjesme)
 Porcija besmisla zb(i)rka (first time presented on the Days of Balint Vujkov in 2003),
 Književnost Hrvata u Mađarskoj od 1918. do danas, 1998, (winner of Matica hrvatska award Srebrna povelja in 2000)
 Rasuto biserje, anthology of Croatian poetry in Hungary 1945-2000, (editor)
 Dječja književnost Hrvata u Mađarskoj od 1945. do danas, 2000
 Mala antologija dječje poezije iz Mađarske, 2000

Blažetin translated from Hungarian into Croatian Paklene priče of Tvrtko Vujić and the works of Miklos Radnoti.

Footnotes

Sources 
Vjesnik Društveni i politički život Hrvata u Mađarskoj, 2000.

External links 
 Hrvatski glasnik
 Hrvatska matica iseljenika Dani HMI "Hrvatske knjige izvan Hrvatske"
 Matica hrvatska Stjepan Blažetin: Književnost Hrvata u Mađarskoj od 1918. do danas
 Hrvatska riječ Nepresušno vrelo jezika
 Slobodna Dalmacija Aktivnosti pečuške kroatističke Katedre
 Medijska dokumentacija Hrvatska riječ: Praznik knjige u Osijeku
Klasje naših ravni Stjepan Blažetin: Porcija besmisla - zb(i)rka
Oktatási és Kulturális Minisztérium Okvirni program hrv. jezika i književnosti za dvojezične škole - Djelatnost suvremenih književnika
 Znanstveni Zavod Hrvata u Mađarskoj

 

1963 births
Living people
People from Nagykanizsa
Croats of Hungary
20th-century Croatian poets
Croatian translators
Hungarian literary critics 
Croatian literary critics 
Hungarian literary historians
Croatian literary historians
Croatian male poets
20th-century Hungarian male writers